Tag, known in Japan as , is a 2015 Japanese action horror film directed by Sion Sono and inspired by the title of the novel Riaru Onigokko by Yusuke Yamada. It was released in Japan on July 11, 2015. The film's theme song, "Real Onigokko", was written and performed for the movie by the rock band Glim Spanky.

Plot
A quiet high school girl named Mitsuko survives a gust of wind that slices through her school bus, bisecting everyone else on board. The wind chases her and kills all the other girls she comes into contact with. Dazed, she stumbles onto a high school campus. She is greeted by girls named Aki, Sur, and Taeko. Aki comforts her and the girls cut class and go to the woods. They muse about whether there are multiple realities with multiple versions of themselves. Sur illustrates predetermination with a white feather, stating that it would mean the time it takes for the feather to fall and where it will land are all decided already. She suggests that fate can be tricked by simply doing something one would never normally do, thus changing the outcome.

Back at school, Mitsuko's teacher suddenly brandishes a machine gun and opens fire, killing all the girls except Mitsuko. Mitsuko is then dragged outside the classroom by Sur and Taeko. They reach a different classroom where they see another girl, who is killed by her teacher. Taeko tries to attack the teacher, however she fails, and is killed. As Sur and Mitsuko try to escape, Sur is shot on the way out. As Mitsuko runs out of the school, other classes are also fleeing from their rooms as well. As the remaining girls flee, one of them pleads for Mitsuko to think about why this is happening. The remaining girls are then sliced apart by the wind.

Mitsuko then wanders into town, where she is recognized as a police officer as Keiko. Mitsuko is horrified when the police officer puts a mirror to her and her appearance has completely changed. She is then taken into the police officer's car for her wedding. At the wedding, she recognizes Aki as one of the bridesmaids. She is then changed into a wedding outfit. Aki, with the help of Keiko, proceeds to kill all the bridesmaids who were helping Keiko get ready. Keiko, holding a broken bottle, walks up to the groom, who is in a coffin. The girls then begin stripping to bikinis, acting as if they were at a party. The coffin opens to reveal a pig head as a groom, and the girls walk up to her, and try to make Keiko kiss the pig head. After a little struggle, Keiko eventually stabs the groom in the neck, and it falls lifeless to the ground. Everyone begins freaking out, and the teachers from the school show up, in more bad-ass attire, and attack Aki and Keiko. After a while, Aki and Keiko win, and as they are leaving, Aki splits from Keiko to 'distract him.'

She eventually finds her way to a bridge, where a girl tells her to follow her. She does, and the two end up in the middle of a marathon run. Mitsuko's identity has once again changed to Izumi. She passes a mirror, and is once again horrified to see that her appearance has changed from a bloody wedding outfit to a marathon runner's outfit, and a ponytail. She eventually finds Aki, Sur, and Taeko, who are all running the race. The teachers show up again, as well as the pig head, and they begin chasing the girls, and kicking the other runners out of the way. She is then told to take a shortcut, where she finds a cave.

In that cave, she encounters a group of revenant girls who try to kill her, stating that so long as she lives, they will continue to die. She is rescued by Aki, who reveals that they are all in a fictional world being observed by "someone" and that this "someone" will continue to kill everyone else unless Mitsuko, as the "main character", does something to change it. Each of the scenarios is a different world, and to reach the final one, Aki says that Mitsuko must brutally kill her by pulling cables from her arms. Mitsuko reluctantly does so and a portal opens.

She finds herself in a lewd city called "Men's World," filled with only men who enjoy a violent 3D survival horror video game called Tag, depicting Mitsuko, Keiko, and Izumi as playable characters. She passes out and awakens in a temple where all the girls are showcased like mannequins. She finds a decrepit old man playing the game on his TV, showing the various trials she went through, and is horrified to see full-size models of herself, Keiko, Izumi, Aki, and all the other girls. The man tells her that she is in the future; 150 years ago, she was a girl he had admired as a fellow student. When she died, he took her DNA and that of her friends and made clones for his 3D game. A younger version of the old man appears and strips, beckoning her to come to bed with him. The old man tells her that this final stage is the fulfillment of his deepest wish: to sleep with her.

Mitsuko attacks the younger man, screaming at him to stop playing with girls like toys. She rips one of the pillows, showering the room with feathers. Remembering what Sur said about tricking fate, she commits suicide, to the shock of the old man, who had not made that part of his game. Finding herself once again in the beginning of each scenario, she simultaneously commits suicide on the bus, at the wedding, and during the marathon before any of the violent scenarios can begin. She then awakens alone in a field of white snow and runs away, realizing that "it's over now".

Cast
Reina Triendl as Mitsuko
Mariko Shinoda as Keiko
Erina Mano as Izumi
Yuki Sakurai as Aki
Maryjun Takahashi as Jun
Sayaka Isoyama as Mutsuko
Takumi Saito cameo

Reception
Tag has an 92% approval rating on Rotten Tomatoes. In Variety, Richard Kuipers described Tag as "grindhouse meets arthouse", praising the acting and photography. Clarence Tsui of The Hollywood Reporter lauded the work as "by turns absurd and affecting, bloody and beautiful, carnal and cerebral." Both critics noted the film's feminist undertones.

Awards

References

External links
 
 リアル鬼ごっこ(2015) at allcinema 
 リアル鬼ごっこ at KINENOTE 
 

2010s action horror films
2015 horror films
Japanese action horror films
Films based on Japanese novels
Films directed by Sion Sono
Japanese action films
Japanese high school films
Films about death games
Universal Pictures films
NBCUniversal Entertainment Japan
Shochiku films
2010s Japanese films
2010s Japanese-language films

ja:リアル鬼ごっこ#リアル鬼ごっこ(2015年映画)